Priyanka Chopra is an Indian actress who has received several awards and nominations including two National Film Award, five Filmfare Awards, eight Producers Guild Film Awards, eight Screen Awards, six IIFA Awards, and two People's Choice Awards. In 2000, she participated in the Femina Miss India contest, where she finished second, winning the Femina Miss India World title. She then entered the Miss World pageant and was crowned Miss World 2000, becoming the fifth Indian to win the contest. Chopra made her Bollywood film debut with a supporting role in the 2003 spy thriller The Hero, which earned her the Stardust Award for Best Supporting Actress. The same year, her performance in the romantic musical Andaaz won her the Filmfare Award for Best Female Debut and a nomination for Best Supporting Actress at the same ceremony. For her portrayal of a seductress in the romantic thriller Aitraaz, Chopra won the Filmfare Award for Best Performance in a Negative Role and received her second nomination for Best Supporting Actress. The same year, she was nominated for the IIFA Award for Best Actress for the romantic comedy Mujhse Shaadi Karogi.

Chopra starred as a troubled model in the drama Fashion (2008), for which she won many Best Actress awards in India including the National Film Award for Best Actress and the Filmfare Award in the same category. In 2010, she received several Best Actress nominations for playing a feisty Marathi woman in the caper thriller Kaminey, winning her second consecutive Producers Guild Film Award for Best Actress in a Leading Role after Fashion. The same year, she was nominated for the Screen Award for Best Actress for playing twelve distinct roles in the social comedy film What's Your Raashee?. For her portrayal of a serial killer, in the 2011 neo-noir 7 Khoon Maaf, she won the Filmfare Award for Best Actress (Critics), in addition to a Best Actress nomination at the same ceremony.

She played the role of an autistic woman in the 2012 romantic drama Barfi!, for which she won the Zee Cine Award for Best Actress and was nominated under the Best Actress category at the Filmfare, Screen, Producers Guild and IIFA awards. In 2014, Chopra's performance as Mary Kom in the eponymous biographical sports drama won her a second Screen and a third Producers Guild Film Award for Best Actress. For her debut single "In My City" (2012), she earned three nominations at the World Music Awards. She received several Best Actress nominations for her performance in the 2015 ensemble family comedy-drama Dil Dhadakne Do, winning the Screen Award for Best Ensemble Cast. The same year, she won the Filmfare Award for Best Supporting Actress, among other accolades, for portraying Kashibai in the historical romantic drama Bajirao Mastani.

In 2016, Chopra received the People's Choice Award for Favourite Actress In A New TV Series for her role in Quantico, becoming the first South Asian actress to win a People's Choice Award. The same year, she was awarded the Padma Shri, the fourth highest civilian award, by the Government of India. In 2017, she won her second People's Choice Award for Favorite Dramatic TV Actress for Quantico. Chopra received the Mother Teresa Memorial Award for Social Justice in 2016 and the Danny Kaye Humanitarian Award from UNICEF in 2019 for her philanthropic work. For playing a protective mother in the biographical drama The Sky Is Pink (2019), she received several nominations, including the Filmfare Award for Best Actress. she received an award for her contribution to world cinema at the ongoing Marrakech International Film Festival in Morocco.

Asian Film Awards
The Asian Film Awards are presented annually by the Hong Kong International Film Festival Society to members of Asian cinema. Chopra has received one award.

Bengal Film Journalists' Association Awards
The Bengal Film Journalists' Association Awards are presented by the oldest association of film critics in India, founded in 1937. Chopra has received one award.

BIG Star Entertainment Awards
The BIG Star Entertainment Awards is an annual event organised by the Reliance Broadcast Network. Chopra has won four awards from ten nominations.

Civilian Awards
The Civilian Awards are presented by the Government of India to citizens of India recognising their contributions to various fields such as Arts, Education, Industry, Literature, Science, Sports, Medicine, Social Service and Public Affairs. Chopra was awarded the Padma Shri, the fourth highest civilian honour in India.

Filmfare Awards
The Filmfare Awards are presented annually by The Times Group for excellence of cinematic achievements in Hindi cinema. Chopra has won five awards in five categories from twelve nominations.

Filmfare Marathi Awards
The Filmfare Marathi Awards are presented annually by The Times Group for excellence of cinematic achievements in Marathi cinema.

FOI Online Awards
FOI Online Awards is an annual online poll, researched, organised and voted by a team of film enthusiasts, honouring the artists for their artworks in Hindi cinema.

Global Indian Film Awards
The Global Indian Film Awards was an awards ceremony organised by Popcorn Entertainment for the Hindi cinema. Chopra has won two awards.

Indian Telly Awards
The Indian Telly Awards are presented annually by indiantelevision.com to honour excellence in the television industry. Chopra has received one award.

International Indian Film Academy Awards
The International Indian Film Academy Awards (shortened as IIFA) is annual international event organised by the Wizcraft International Entertainment Pvt. Ltd. to honour excellence in the Hindi cinema. Chopra has won six awards from twelve nominations.

Lions Gold Awards
The Lions Gold Awards are presented annually by members of the Lions Club of SOL — Mumbai to honour excellence in the Hindi cinema. Chopra has won six awards.

Maharashtra State Film Awards
The Maharashtra State Film Awards are presented annually by the Government of Maharashtra for excellence of cinematic achievements in Marathi cinema.

Mirchi Music Awards
The Mirchi Music Awards are presented annually by Radio Mirchi to honour excellence in the Hindi language film music industry. Chopra has received two nominations.

Mirchi Music Awards Marathi
The Mirchi Music Awards Marathi are presented annually by Radio Mirchi to honour excellence in the Marathi language film music industry.

Mother Teresa Awards
The Mother Teresa Awards are presented annually by the Harmony Foundation to honour social work.

MTV Europe Music Awards
The MTV Europe Music Awards was established in 1994 by MTV Europe to award the music videos from European and international artists. Chopra has won one award from two nominations.

National Film Awards
The National Film Awards is the most prestigious film award ceremony in India. Established in 1954, it is administered by the International Film Festival of India and the Indian government's Directorate of Film Festivals. The awards are presented by the President of India. Due to their national scale, they are considered to be the equivalent of the Academy Awards. Chopra has received two awards, first for Fashion as an actress and second for Paani as a producer.

Nickelodeon Kids' Choice Awards India
The Nickelodeon Kids' Choice Awards India is the Indian version of the American awards show recognising Indian Film, TV, Music and Sports. Chopra has received one award.

People's Choice Awards
The People's Choice Awards is an annual awards show recognising the people and the work of popular culture, voted by the general public. Chopra has won two awards. She is the first South Asian actress to win a People's Choice Award.

People's Choice Awards India
The People's Choice Awards India is the Indian version of the American awards show recognising Indian film, television, music and sports. Chopra has received one award.

Producers Guild Film Awards
The Producers Guild Film Awards (previously known as Apsara Film & Television Producers Guild Awards) is an annual event organised by the Film Producers Guild of India. Chopra has won eight awards from thirteen nominations.

Screen Awards
The Screen Awards are annually presented by the Indian Express Limited to honour excellence of cinematic achievements in Hindi and Marathi cinema. Chopra has won eight awards from twenty seven nominations.

Shanghai International Film Festival
The Shanghai International Film Festival is one of the largest film festivals in East Asia. Chopra has received one award.

Stardust Awards
The Stardust Awards are an annual event organised by Magna Publishing Company Limited to honour excellence in the Hindi cinema. Chopra has won seven awards from fifteen nominations.

Teen Choice Awards
The Teen Choice Awards is an annual awards show that airs on the Fox Network. The awards honor the year's biggest achievements in music, movies, sports, television, fashion and other categories, voted by teen viewers.

Times of India Film Awards
The Times of India Film Awards (shortened as TOIFA) is an international event organised by The Times Group to reward excellence in Hindi cinema. Chopra has received two awards.

World Music Awards
The World Music Awards is an international awards ceremony founded in 1989 that annually honours recording artists based on worldwide sales figures provided by the International Federation of the Phonographic Industry (IFPI). Chopra has received three nominations.

Zee Cine Awards
The Zee Cine Awards are an annual award ceremony organised by the Zee Entertainment Enterprises. Chopra has won two awards from ten nominations.

Zee Gaurav Puraskar
The Zee Gaurav Puraskar are presented annually by Zee Network for excellence of cinematic achievements in Marathi cinema.

Other awards

Pageants

Footnotes

References

External links
 

Chopra, Priyanka
Chopra, Priyanka